Masilo Ramothata (born 30 November 1989) is a South African cricketer. He made his first-class debut for Griqualand West in the 2014–15 Sunfoil 3-Day Cup on 11 December 2014.

References

External links
 

1989 births
Living people
South African cricketers
Gauteng cricketers
Griqualand West cricketers
Cricketers from Johannesburg